Jesús Rubio may refer to:

 Jesús Rubio (footballer, born 1994), Andorran football player
 Jesús Rubio (footballer, born 1996), Mexican football player
 Jesús Alberto Rubio (born 1992), Spanish cyclist
 Jesús González Rubio (died 1874), Mexican musician
 Jesús Rubio (footballer, born 1987), Spanish football player